Hareh Shun Dasht (also Romanized as Hareh Shūn Dasht; also known as Harshūn Dasht) is a village in Tula Rud Rural District, in the Central District of Talesh County, Gilan Province, Iran. At the 2006 census, its population was 34, in 5 families.

References 

Populated places in Talesh County